Inan Peak is a peak rising to   west of Mount Kempe in the Royal Society Range of Victoria Land, Antarctica. It was named by the Advisory Committee on Antarctic Names in 1994 named after Umran Inan of Stanford University, who has conducted critical research since 1980 in the upper atmosphere of Antarctica at Siple Station and Palmer Station, and is internationally recognized as a leader in the study of upper-atmospheric phenomena.

References

Mountains of Victoria Land
Scott Coast